Yolande of Montferrat ( – 1317 in Constantinople) (also known as Violante, then Empress Irene) was the second wife of Andronikos II Palaiologos and thus Empress of the Byzantine Empire. She was the heir of the Margraviate of Montferrat.

Born in Casale, she was daughter of William VII, Marquess of Montferrat and his second wife Beatrice of Castile. Her maternal grandparents were King Alfonso X of Castile and his wife Violante of Aragon. Yolande (variation of Violante) was named after her grandmother.

In 1284, Andronikos II, a widower by his first marriage with Anna of Hungary, married Yolanda (who was renamed Eirene as Empress). She and Andronikos II were distant cousins, both being descendants of Andronikos Doukas Angelos (ca. 1122–1185). With her, Eirene brought the Montferrat rights to the kingdom of Thessalonica, a dominion that, despite having been conquered half-a-century before Eirene's birth by the Byzantine state of Epirus, was still claimed by its short-lived (1204–1224) Montferrat royal dynasty.

It was later proven that the Italian Montferrat had no living male heirs of the Aleramici dynasty, and Eirene's sons were entitled to inherit it upon the 1305 death of Eirene's brother John I, Marquess of Montferrat.

The marriage produced the following children:

 John Palaiologos (c. 1286–1308), despotes.
 Bartholomaios Palaiologos (born 1289), died young.
 Theodore I, Marquis of Montferrat (1291–1338).
 Simonis Palaiologina (1294–after 1336), who married King Stefan Milutin of Serbia.
 Theodora Palaiologina (born 1295), died young.
 Demetrios Palaiologos (1297–1343), despotēs. Father of Irene Palaiologina.
 Isaakios Palaiologos (born 1299), died young.

Eirene's stepson, Michael IX Palaiologos was intended to succeed her husband as emperor, but ultimately it was Michael's son Andronikos III Palaiologos, who became the successor instead of Michael. This was largely due to the work Eirene did to ensure some power and property to her own offspring.

Eirene left Constantinople in 1303 and settled in Thessalonica. She set her own court in the city and controlled her own finances and foreign policy until her death fourteen years later. Nicephorus Gregoras portrayed her as an ambitious and arrogant leader in his historical writings.

References

External links

 The  project "involves extracting and analysing detailed information from primary sources, including contemporary chronicles, cartularies, necrologies and testaments."

1274 births
1317 deaths
People from Casale Monferrato
Palaiologos dynasty
13th-century Byzantine empresses
14th-century Byzantine empresses
13th-century Italian nobility
14th-century Italian nobility
13th-century Italian women
14th-century Italian women
Aleramici
Converts to Eastern Orthodoxy from Roman Catholicism
Italian people of Portuguese descent
Italian people of German descent
Italian people of French descent
Italian people of Hungarian descent
Italian people of English descent
Italian people of Spanish descent
Burials at Lips Monastery